The Bartercard Cup (successor of the Lion Red Cup) was the top level rugby league club competition in New Zealand from 2000 until 2007. For the entire life of the tournament it was sponsored by Bartercard. The cup was administered by the New Zealand Rugby League. The tournament was discontinued by the NZRL in 2007 and was replaced by the Bartercard Premiership in 2008.

Franchises 

The format of the competition changed several times over the life of the competition and in total 24 clubs or franchises competed. In the first season half of the clubs were from Auckland but as the competition went on more and more franchises represented the provinces. The Canterbury Bulls were the only franchise to compete in every season.

Seasons

See also 

 New Zealand Rugby League
 Rugby league in New Zealand

External links 
 
 Longest Game in Living Memory

Rugby league competitions in New Zealand